Choi Hye-Ra (born May 20, 1991) is a South Korean swimmer, who specialized in butterfly and individual medley events. She collected four medals (1 silver and 3 bronze) in the 200 m butterfly, 200 m individual medley, and the 800 m freestyle relay at the 2006 Asian Games in Doha, Qatar, and at the 2010 Asian Games in Guangzhou, China. She also won a silver medal in the same medley distance at the 2011 Summer Universiade in Shenzhen, China, with a time of 2:14.17. She is a resident athlete of Osan Sports Club in Seoul.

Choi made her official debut at age 17, at the 2008 Summer Olympics in Beijing. She qualified for three swimming events by eclipsing a FINA A-cut of 2:09.46 (200 m butterfly) from the International Swim Meet in Chiba, Japan. On the first night of the preliminaries, she challenged five other swimmers in heat two, including Cyprus' Natallia Hadjiloizou (previously competed for Belarus). She finished behind Estonia's Triin Aljand in second place and 40th overall with a time of 1:00.65. In the 200 m individual medley, she touched out Slovenia's Anja Klinar to take the third spot on the same heat and 24th overall by 0.13 of a second, in a time of 2:15.26. In her third and final event, 200 m butterfly, she rounded out a top seeded heat with a last-place finish by nearly a second behind Brazil's Joanna Melo in 2:11.42. She failed to advance into the semifinals, as she placed 23rd overall in the preliminary heats.

Four years later, Choi qualified for two swimming events at the 2012 Summer Olympics in London by clearing FINA A-standard entry times of 2:13.00 (200 m individual medley) and 2:08.81 (200 m butterfly) from the FINA World Championships in Shanghai, China. In the 200 m individual medley, she finished heat four in sixth place by 0.19 of a second behind Great Britain's Sophie Allen, lowering her Olympic time to 2:14.91. She placed 24th in the preliminary heats, and did not advance further into the semifinals. Unlike her previous Olympics, she registered a tenth-fastest time of 2:08.45 in the 200 m butterfly to secure her spot for the semifinals on the morning's preliminary heats. She failed to qualify for the final, as she finished the semifinal run with a third-slowest time of 2:08.32.

References

External links
NBC Olympics Profile

1991 births
Living people
South Korean female butterfly swimmers
Olympic swimmers of South Korea
Swimmers at the 2008 Summer Olympics
Swimmers at the 2012 Summer Olympics
Asian Games medalists in swimming
Swimmers at the 2006 Asian Games
Swimmers at the 2010 Asian Games
South Korean female medley swimmers
Swimmers from Seoul
Asian Games silver medalists for South Korea
Asian Games bronze medalists for South Korea
Medalists at the 2006 Asian Games
Medalists at the 2010 Asian Games
Universiade medalists in swimming
Universiade silver medalists for South Korea
Medalists at the 2011 Summer Universiade
21st-century South Korean women